TV or television is a telecommunication medium for transmitting and receiving moving images and sound.

TV may also refer to:

Arts and entertainment
 .tv (TV channel), a British TV channel
 TV (The Book), a 2016 collection of essays by Alan Sepinwall and Matt Zoller Seitz
 "TV" (song), a 2022 song by Billie Eilish
 Tribes: Vengeance or T:V, a video game in the Tribes series

Places
 Titov Veles, Macedonia (vehicle registration prefix TV)
 Trebišov, a town in Slovakia
 Province of Treviso, Italy (vehicle registration prefix TV)
 Tualatin Valley, a place near Portland, Oregon, United States
 Tuvalu (ISO 3166-1 country code TV)

Science and technology
 Television set, a device used to view television broadcasts
 .tv, the country code top-level domain of Tuvalu
 TV Seastar, a jet aircraft
 Fokker T.V, a World War II bomber aircraft
 Shutter priority or TV, a setting on cameras that allows the user to choose a shutter speed
 Teravolt, a multiple of the SI-derived unit of electrical potential, the Volt
 Tidal volume, the normal amount of air inspired and expired at rest

Other uses
 T–V distinction, a contrast, within one language, between second-person pronouns to indicate levels of politeness
 Virgin Express (IATA airline code TV)
 Transvestite, a person who habitually dresses in cross-sex clothing without intention to medically or hormonally transition to that sex
 Apple TV app, app for Apple TV, iOS and other devices
 TeeVee (cartoonist), Indian political cartoonist

See also
 Mike Teavee, a fictional character in the Roald Dahl novel Charlie and the Chocolate Factory, and adaptations
 &TV TV station
 Television (disambiguation)
 ITV (disambiguation)
 Apple TV (disambiguation)